Sozusa heterocera is a moth in the subfamily Arctiinae. It was described by Francis Walker in 1864. It is found in South Africa.

References

Endemic moths of South Africa
Moths described in 1864
Lithosiina